Velikodvorskaya is a rural locality (a village) in Chushevitskoye Rural Settlement, Verkhovazhsky District, Vologda Oblast, Russia. The population was 91 as of 2002. There are 2 streets.

Geography 
Velikodvorskaya is located 40 km south of Verkhovazhye (the district's administrative centre) by road. Terentyevskaya is the nearest rural locality.

References 

Rural localities in Verkhovazhsky District